The Cayman Islands Regiment is the home defence unit of the British Overseas Territory of the Cayman Islands. It is a single territorial infantry and engineer reserve unit of the British Armed Forces that was formed in 2020. The Regiment has an authorized strength level objective of 175 personnel, akin to that of a company-sized unit.

History

2019
On 12 October 2019, the government announced the formation of the Cayman Islands Regiment, a new British Armed Forces unit. The Cayman Islands Regiment was planned to become operational in 2020, with an initial 35–50 personnel of mostly reservists that are locally recruited and likely initially trained as engineers. The expected growth of the Regiment is expected to see an increase of personnel to several hundred. One of the main goals of the Regiment would be humanitarian relief, responding to natural disasters on the islands as well as regionally to events such as hurricanes. However, the Regiment is to be assisted by the UK Ministry of Defence and Foreign and Commonwealth Office and is likely to be in the form of logistical advice and support and further along include operational training and equipment. It was said to be in ways similar to the Royal Bermuda Regiment, the Royal Gibraltar Regiment, the Falkland Islands Defence Force and Royal Montserrat Defence Force and is to be linked with the British Army Corps of Royal Engineers. A team of experts from the United Kingdom Ministry of Defence and the Foreign and Commonwealth Office will deploy to the Cayman Islands before end of year for operational needs assessment, to begin the advisory and support roles and to determine a suitable location to base the Regiment.

On 15 October 2019, Government of Bermuda issued a statement that the Royal Bermuda Regiment is ready to assist the Cayman Islands Regiment and to share their experiences, as the Cayman Islands Regiment builds.

In mid-November 2019, the team from the United Kingdom Ministry of Defence from 131 Commando Squadron Royal Engineers, 40 Commando Royal Marines, and Royal Navy arrived in Grand Cayman to begin work on setting up the Cayman Islands Regiment.

In mid-December 2019, recruitment for junior and commanding officers began, with the commanding officers expected to begin work in January 2020 and the junior officers to begin work in February 2020.

In December 2019, Turks and Caicos Islands Governor Nigel Dakin had announced that they will also follow the Cayman Islands in the formation of the Turks and Caicos Regiment. The Turks and Caicos Regiment will operate similarly to the Cayman Islands Regiment and the Royal Bermuda Regiment and the roles of the Regiment will also be the same as their British Overseas Territories counterparts. The Turks and Caicos Regiment also will be assisted by the UK Ministry of Defence and Foreign and Commonwealth Office.

2020

In late January 2020, the first set of senior officers and junior officers were chosen. The Commanding Officer was announced to be Lieutenant Colonel Simon Watson, who was formerly an Officer for the Royal Dragoon Guards. The Second in Command is Lieutenant Colonel Simon Spiers. The Staff Judge Advocate and Regimental Legal Advisor is Major Andre Mon Desir, who was the Supreme Court Judge in Trinidad and Tobago and also a member of the Trinidad and Tobago Defence Force. The first six junior officers were chosen, these six will be sent for training in mid-February 2020 to Bermuda with the Royal Bermuda Regiment, and thereafter onwards to the United Kingdom for additional officer training at Royal Military Academy Sandhurst. An additional 50-60 personnel will be recruited and will also be sent for training in Bermuda with the Royal Bermuda Regiment in early Summer 2020. The Regimental Sergeant Major is Warrant Officer 1 David Shelton, who has had 13 years of non-commissioned officer experience in the British Army with operational tours of duty, training, and recruitment.

In early June 2020, five of the junior officer cadets began their officer training at Royal Military Academy Sandhurst and the recruitment of the 50 additional personnel began.

2021
In late 2020 into early 2021 saw the Recruitment of Cohort 1 of 2021. A Short Term Training Team was deployed to Grand Cayman to assist the Regiment with the training of the recruits as well as to deliver kit. In the Summer of 2021 saw the Recruitment of Cohort 2 of 2021 which also saw another Short Term Training Team also deployed from the UK to assist. Also during the Summer of 2021 saw the Regiment acquire logistical vehicular equipment by way of three HX-60 MANS Trucks, two Unimog Ambulances, one Volvo Front Loader, and one Kratcher Tactical Field Kitchen trailer. In 2021 the Cayman Islands Regiment also saw the official publication of the Defence Bill in the Cayman Islands Parliament.

Commanding officers
As of January 2020, the commanding officer is Lieutenant Colonel Simon Watson. Lieutenant Colonel Watson will leave his post as Commanding Officer of the Regiment on 1 April 2023. As of March 2023, Colonel Roger Carter will be the Regiment's new Commanding Officer on 1 April 2023.

Former Commanding Officers
Lieutenant Colonel Simon Watson (2020-2023)

Recruitment and training

Commissioned Officers
The first set of junior officer recruits were sent to Bermuda to train at Warwick Camp alongside recruits of the Royal Bermuda Regiment for their basic military training. This is a two-week course. The first set of Junior Officers then gone on to an intense condensed 8 week Officer course at Royal Military Academy Sandhurst. The following sets of Officer Cadets were sent directly to the 8 week course at Royal Military Academy Sandhurst.

Non-Commissioned Officers & Recruits
Upon passing through the selection process recruits attend a 14-day non-residential Basic training camp. The basic training gives the recruits the following requisite skills: weapon training, first-aid, radio communications, drill, basic navigation and fitness. Since 2020 the Regiment has taken on several cohorts with 1-2 new cohorts a year. As of Mid-2021 the Regiment has over 100 members, and is still growing. Further training is given to the members after basic training, this not only further skills gained by the members but also provides promotions through the ranks.

Uniforms

Clothing 
The uniforms, weapons, and equipment for the Cayman Islands Regiment will be provided by the United Kingdom Ministry of Defence. During the basic training, the recruits are given the same kits as those of the Royal Bermuda Regiment recruits. This is mainly the British Army's No. 8 Combat Dress Multi-Terrain Pattern Personal Clothing System – Combat Uniform (PCS-CU). The PCS-CU mostly consists of a windproof smock, a lightweight jacket, and trousers with a range of ancillaries such as thermals and waterproofs. Recruits are also issued with British Army Standard Issued Brown Combat Boots. Regimental Personnel also have the No.2 Service Dress, This is (part of Future Army Dress (FAD) programme)a khaki Jacket and Trousers with Fawn dress shirt with tie and dress shoes. No.3 Warm Weather Dress, This is a white Tunic with dark blue Trousers with a red stripe at the sides. No.4 Warm Weather Service Dress, This is for the Officers its similar to the No.2 however in a Stone colour. The No.13 Barracks Dress, This is similar to the No. 2 without the jacket and could be worn with green 'wolly-pully' jumper or woollen jersey.

Ranks
Ranks of the Cayman Islands Regiment are exactly the same as the rest of the British Army:

Commissioned Officers 

Non-Commissioned Officers

Equipment
Cayman Islands Regiment uses the following vehicles:

See also 
 British Army Training and Support Unit Belize
 Cayman Islands Coast Guard
 Overseas military bases of the United Kingdom

References

External links
 Cayman Islands Regiment

Regiments of the British Army
British colonial regiments
Military of the Cayman Islands
Military units and formations established in 2020